Le Défi Media Group is a mass media company based in Port Louis, Mauritius. The group's operations include newspapers, magazines, radio and digital media. The newspapers, magazines and radio are mostly published and broadcast in French.

Newspapers and magazines
The Défi group owns two magazines and some of the leading newspapers in Mauritius.
 Le Dimanche/L'Hebdo
 This weekly newspaper are issued on Sunday and published in French Language.
 Le Défi Foot
 Newspaper issued on Football/ Soccer.
 Le Défi Immobilier
 This magazine are issued to tackle the Mauritian immobilier as per local demand.
 Le Défi Moteurs
 This magazine are issued to Mauritian audience wishing to know more on automobile industry.
 Le Défi Plus
 This is a weekly newspaper issued on Saturday and published in French Language
 Le Défi Quotidien
 Daily newspaper come every weekdays and publish in French language. They usually accompanied with supplement such as Bollywood masala...
 Le Défi Sexo
 News On Sunday
 News on Sunday come every Sunday and is published in English language.
 Le Défi Turf 
 Magazine for horse-racing lovers and issued during the turf season as decided by the Mauritius Turf Club.
 Le Défi Life

Radio and Television
The Défimedia group is the owner of Radio Plus, a leading private radio station in Mauritius. It starts operation in 2004 and has slogan " Écouté ou pou Tendé " ( Listen you will hear) and a Web TV  stations on the internet.
 TéléPlus, an online webTV for news and entertainment Programs, with the slogan " Gété ou pou Trouvé" (Look you will see).

See also

 List of newspapers in Mauritius
 List of magazines in Mauritius
List of radio stations in Mauritius

References

Companies based in Port Louis
Newspaper companies of Mauritius
Mass media companies of Mauritius
Mass media in Port Louis